Vaghi may refer to:

 Edgardo Vaghi, Italian bobsledder.
 Peter Vaghi, American Roman Catholic priest.
 Giacomo Vaghi, Italian opera singer.
 Ricardo Vaghi, an Argentine footballer who played for River Plate in the 1940s.
 Vagindra script, a Mongolian alphabet.